Al-Afyush is a sub-district located in Mudhaykhirah District, Ibb Governorate, Yemen. Al-Afyush had a population of 8,870 according to the 2004 census.

References 

Sub-districts in Mudhaykhirah District